Christopher Harrison (born 3 October 1957) is an Australian former water polo player who competed in the 1988 Summer Olympics.

References

1957 births
Living people
Australian male water polo players
Olympic water polo players of Australia
Water polo players at the 1988 Summer Olympics
20th-century Australian people